Aliza Greenblatt (September 8, 1888 - September 21, 1975) was an American Yiddish poet.  Many of her poems, which were widely published in the Yiddish press, were also set to music and recorded by composers including Abraham Ellstein, Solomon Golub, and Esther Zweig. They were also recorded by Theodore Bikel and Sidor Belarsky, among others. Greenblatt published five volumes of Yiddish poetry and an autobiography in Yiddish, Baym fentsṭer fun a lebn (A Window on a Life ) and her works include such well-known Yiddish songs as Fisherlid, Amar Abaye, and Du, Du.

Early life 
Aliza Greenblatt was born in Azarenits, Bessarabia in the Podolia Governorate of the Russian Empire (present-day Ukraine), to Brokhe Bas-Tsion Rozovsky and Abraham Aronson. After her father died unexpectedly in 1893, her mother remarried and the family moved to Soroca. Aliza, her step-father, and her three step-brothers came to Philadelphia in 1900. Her mother and her younger sister immigrated in 1904 while her older sister arrived with her own family in 1922.

Marriage and move to Israel 
She married Isadore Greenblatt, also from Bessarabia, in 1907.

The couple had five children, Herbert (1908), David (1914), Gertrude (1915), Marjorie (1917), and Bernard (1921). In 1920 the couple made a failed attempt to move to the land of Israel, to Mandatory Palestine. Thirty years later they tried again, after the establishment of the Jewish state, but after a year of struggling with the difficult conditions, they moved back to the United States, to New York City.

Isador's birth name was Isadore Stukelman. He is a cousin of Shifra Stukelman, and through her, cousin twice removed to Canadian composer Jan Randall (her grandson). Isador died in 1960, an active promoter of investment in Israel.

Her daughter Marjorie was a dancer in the Martha Graham Dance Company, and was married to folk musician Woody Guthrie. Marjorie's children are folk musician Arlo Guthrie,  Woody Guthrie archivist Nora Guthrie, and Joady Guthrie. Her nephew, and Aliza's grandson, is computer programmer Richard Greenblatt.

Aliza Greenblatt also helped found the Atlantic City, NJ chapters of the Zionist Organization of America, Hadassah and the Yidish Natsionaler Arbeter Farband. She was the president of the Pioneer Women. She was also involved with fundraising for the Jewish National Fund and Histadrut.

Books by Aliza Greenblatt
 (My Life). Farlag Kadime-Central Philadelphia 1935.
 (Ten Poems with Music). Alizah Greenblatt: Brooklyn 1939.
 (I Sing). Farlag Aliza: New York, 1947. 
 (Me and You). Farlag Aliza: New York, 1951.
 (In Sea Gate by the Ocean). Farlag Aliza: New York, 1957.
 (At the Window of a Life). Farlag Aliza: New York, 1966.

References

1888 births
1975 deaths
People from Vinnytsia Oblast
People from Mogilyovsky Uyezd (Podolian Governorate)
Jewish American writers
Jewish poets
Emigrants from the Russian Empire to the United States
American people of Ukrainian-Jewish descent
Yiddish-language poets
Aliza
20th-century American Jews
20th-century Ukrainian Jews